Tungawan, officially the Municipality of Tungawan (Chavacano: Municipalidad de Tungawan), is a 2nd class municipality in the province of Zamboanga Sibugay, Philippines. According to the 2020 census, it has a population of 46,497 people.

It was declared as a municipality on May 24, 1959, and started functioning as a Local Government Unit (LGU) on January 29, 1961, by virtue of Executive Order No. 395. Its name was coined from the minute leech generally known as “tungaw” of the Hirudo family.

Tungawan's economy is primarily based on agriculture, producing rubber, coconut, corn, rice, and seaweeds. It is home to the 880 hectares Bangaan Marine Sanctuary at Barangays Linguisan and Tigbucay.

Geography

Barangays
Tungawan is politically subdivided into 25 barangays.

Climate

Demographics

Economy

References

External links
 Tungawan Profile at PhilAtlas.com
 [ Philippine Standard Geographic Code]
Philippine Census Information

Municipalities of Zamboanga Sibugay
Establishments by Philippine executive order